RosWall (2008) is an environmental art mosaic project located in Roswell, Georgia, United States, a northern suburb of the state capital of Atlanta.

The mosaic runs approximately 150 feet and began on a small portion of the wall and has continued to grow with the help of local groups including students of the nearby The Cottage School and local mosaic artist Donna Pinter.

Detailed views

See also

 Symphony of Color

References

External links
 Mosaics by Donna Pinter

Mosaics
Year of work missing
Art in Roswell, Georgia
Tourist attractions in Roswell, Georgia
Outdoor sculptures in Georgia (U.S. state)